The Illustre was an 80-gun Bucentaure-class 80-gun ship of the line of the French Navy, designed by Sané.

Career 
Illustre was given to Holland with the Treaty of Fontainebleau of 1814.

Notes and references
Notes

References

Bibliography* 

 

Ships of the line of the French Navy
Ships built in France
Bucentaure-class ships of the line
1811 ships